The Baru Barat River is a man-made canal flowing from the Cisadane River in Bogor Regency to Jakarta, Indonesia. It was one of two canals built in the 18th century under the order of the Governor-General Gustaaf Willem van Imhoff, the other being the Baru Timur River. Both canals were originally built to transport agricultural harvests from Bogor to Batavia (now Jakarta). They are among the main rivers in Jakarta, and part of the Ciliwung Cisadane flood control project. The Baru Barat River flows through the districts of Pancoran and Tebet in South Jakarta, and drains into the Banjir Kanal Barat.

Etymology
The name  ('New River') is associated with a fishing harbor in the Tanjung Priok area of North Jakarta. In the 1960s, a new harbor was established to replace the  fishing harbor which closed in 1967. After the new fishing harbor was closed in 1988, the area was used for unloading lumber bound for Jakarta.

History
The canal was completed 14 years later, in 1753, but its use for transportation failed due to leaks and the high cost of building multiple water gates. The canal was used only for irrigation.

These combined canals form what is now called the Baru Timur River. Due to high maintenance and repair costs, in 1776, Van Imhoff ordered the opening of another canal from the Cisadane River to the Ci Liwung.

Geographically, the Baru Barat River (the western canal) was dug from the Cisadane River, passing the Cipakancilan River, into the Minangkabau River, and discharging into the Banjir Kanal Barat.

The Baru Barat River helps irrigate rice and fruit fields in Cilebut, Citayam, Depok, Pondok Cina, Tanjung Barat, and Pondok Labu. It is no longer connected to the Ci Liwung.

Hydrology
The Baru Barat River is grouped into the Central Area Stream Handling System of Jakarta, along with the Krukut River, Ci Liwung, and Banjir Kanal Barat. It has a total entry debit at the upstream of 50 m3/sec and at the downstream of 290 m3/sec, and an exit debit at the upstream of 150 m3/sec and at the downstream of 370 m3/sec, from about 17 tributaries.

The depth reached only the toes during the dry season, but up to  during the rainy season. The bottom and banks of the river were covered by green algae and wild bushes, giving a green tint to the river despite the transparent water.

The Baru Barat River is a source of flooding in Jakarta, mainly due to garbage accumulating in the river. In 2015, the government made noticeable progress cleaning the river.

Climate
The river flows in the northwest area of Java with predominantly tropical rainforest climate (designated as Af in the Köppen-Geiger climate classification). The wettest month is December, with an average of  rainfall, and the driest is September, with  rainfall.

See also
 List of rivers of Java

References

Rivers of Jakarta
Rivers of Indonesia